Sandamu is a Local Government Area in Katsina State, Nigeria. Its headquarters are in the town of Sandamu on the A2 highway in the north of the area at.

It has an area of 1418 km and a population of 137,287 at the 2006 census.

The postal code of the area is 824.

References

External links
Sandamu

Local Government Areas in Katsina State